Austropeplea viridis is a species of air-breathing freshwater snail, an aquatic pulmonate gastropod mollusk in the family Lymnaeidae, the pond snails.

Distribution 
This species occurs in:

 Russian Federation: Kuril Islands
 Japan
 South Korea
 China and Hong Kong
 Nepal
 Myanmar
 Thailand
 Vietnam – it widely distributed in northern, central, and southern Vietnam.
 Indonesia (Papua)
 Papua New Guinea
 Philippines
 Guam

The nonidigenous distribution of this species includes:
 Australia

Description
The shell has 4.5–5 whorls.

The shape of the aperture is regularly oval. The width of the aperture is 3–4 mm. The height of the aperture is 5–6 mm.

The width of the shell is 4–6 mm. The height of the shell is 10–13 mm.

Habitat
Autropeplea viridis was found in rice fields, ditches, small canals, and submerged vegetable fields.

Parasites 
Parasites of Austropeplea viridis include:
 Orientocreadium batrachoides
 Fasciola hepatica 
 In Vietnam, Austropeplea viridis serves as an intermediate host for the trematode Fasciola gigantica.

References

External links 

Lymnaeidae
Gastropods described in 1832